Myq Kaplan (born October 7, 1978) is an American stand-up comedian. Born Michael Kaplan in Livingston, New Jersey, he is based in Boston and New York City.

Education
Kaplan received his bachelor's degree from Brandeis University in 2000 and a master's degree in linguistics from Boston University. While a student at Boston University in 2005, he won its "funniest student" contest.

Comedy career
Kaplan tours North America regularly and has performed over 1,000 shows at comedy clubs.

He was a semifinalist in the 2006 Boston Comedy Festival and in the 2006 Seattle Comedy Competition. He was one of nine finalists in Comedy Central's 2007 Open Mic Fight competition. In 2008, a reader poll by Boston's The Phoenix named him Local Comedian of the Year. He took part in Montreal's Just for Laughs comedy festival in 2009.

Television, internet and recordings
Myq Kaplan has appeared on Comedy Central's Live at Gotham and in promotional work for the network. He has been featured on ABC News Now.

On December 16, 2009, he performed for the first time on The Tonight Show. Kaplan also appeared as a contestant on the competition TV series Last Comic Standing during the summer 2010. He placed fifth in the competition.

He is also a frequent guest on long running comedy podcast Keith and the Girl.

Myq Kaplan has been a guest on the podcast "Comedy Bang! Bang!" twice, #110 (June 27, 2011) and #658 (May 31, 2020).

Myq Kaplan has been a guest on the podcast "You Made It Weird With Pete Holmes" 2 times, one released on April 4, 2012 and as a returning guest released December 20, 2017

Kaplan hosts his own podcast Hang Out with Me.

On April 30, 2010, his Comedy Central Presents special aired on Comedy Central.

Myq Kaplan's comedy album Vegan Mind Meld was released April 27, 2010, and his second album, Please Be Seated was released in 2012.

In August 2014, Myq Kaplan's one-hour standup special entitled Small, Dork, and Handsome appeared on Netflix for streaming.

On February 14, 2014 Kaplan was the first guest on Ken Reid's TV Guidance Counselor Podcast.

On January 31, he was the first guest on Bombing with Mike Dorval, where he talked about his joke writing and a joke that bombed for The New York Times.

Kaplan was also a contestant on the tenth season of America's Got Talent. He was eliminated in the Quarterfinals.

Personal life
Kaplan is also a musician, primarily as a guitarist and vocalist. He is a vegan, polyamorous  and once described himself as "atheistic". However, he elaborated in a 2016 podcast that he has become more spiritual through use of psychedelics.

Discography

Comedy albums
 Vegan Mind Meld (2010, BSeenMedia)
 Meat Robot (2013, Comedy Central Records)
 Small, Dork, and Handsome (2014, Comedy Dynamics)
 No Kidding (2017, ASpecialThing Records)
 A.K.A. (2020, Blonde Medicine)

Music albums
 Please Be Seated w/ Micah Sherman (2012, BSeenMedia)
 Many Mini Musics (2016, My Grandfather Was A Spy)

Podcast albums
 The Best of Super Hang, Vol. 1 (2014, Keith and The Girl)
 The Long Shot Season 3 - Episode #318: "Road Trips (feat. Myq Kaplan)" (2015)

EPs
 The Micah Myq Mega Mixtape w/ Micah Sherman (2014, Bandcamp, 9-tracks)

Singles
 The Micah Myq Mega Mixtape w/ Micah Sherman (2016, BSeenMedia, 3-tracks)

Compilation appearances
 Comedy Death-Ray Xmas CD 2010 (2010) - Track 3: "How Hitler Saved Christmas"
 Live from Jamestown: Latenight @ Lucy Comedy Fest 2013 (2014) - Track 14: "The Fast & Furious"
 The Comedy Holiday Album (2017) - Track 10: "Merry Passover"
 Just for Laughs: Premium, Vol. 26 (2018) - Track 10: "Children (Jfl 2015)"
 Just for Laughs: Funny AF, Vol. 6 (2019) - Track 13: "My Demographic (Jfl 2012)"

Film and television appearances

Films
 JK LOL (Short, 2009) - Himself
 Broken Mike (2012) - Himself
 Like Me (2014) - Himself
 Welcome to Bridgetown (2015) - Himself
 Punching Henry (2016) - Zack
 Off Stage: Myq Kaplan (2017) - Himself
 Tasteless (2018) - Himself
 Stalking Emo (not yet released) - Himself

TV series
 Louie (2010) - Myq Kaplan
 Comedy Bang! Bang! (2015) - Lenny
 The Comedy Show Show (2016) - Mitch Hedberg
 Who Is? (2016) - Voice
 Giving Up (2017) - Wake Performer
 Tales from the Trip (2019) - Himself
 Comedy Central Originals: High School Fails (2019) - Himself
 Broadway Comedy Club Presents (2020) - Contestant/Comic
 Mystery Mansion (2021) - Eyeball

Comedy specials
 Comedy Central Presents (2010, Comedy Central)
 Small, Dork, and Handsome (2014, Comedy Dynamics/Netflix)

Stand-up appearances
 Live at Gotham (1 episode, 2008)
 The Tonight Show with Conan O'Brien (1 episode, 2009)
 Last Comic Standing (1 episode, 2010)
 The Late Late Show with Craig Ferguson (4 episodes, 2010–13)
 Late Show with David Letterman (2 episodes, 2011–12)
 Conan (5 episodes, 2011–17)
 Funny As Hell (1 episode, 2012)
 Late Night with Seth Meyers (1 episode, 2014)
 Just for Laughs (1 episode, 2015)
 America's Got Talent (3 episodes, 2015)
 The Late Late Show with James Corden (1 episode, 2017)
 Paste Magazine (1 video, 2018)

Videography

Comedy animations
 Jews and Sea Creatures (2010)
 Axes and Brains (2014)
 Highs and Lose (2014)
 Nothing, Everything, and Eddie Murphy (2017)
 A Meditation to Help You Relax... (2020)
 The Longest Sidewalk in the World (2020)

Music videos
 Bop 25 w/ Micah Sherman (2012)
 Movie Star w/ Micah Sherman (2013)
 Comedian's National Anthem w/ Micah Sherman (2013)
 Music's Fun (To Play) (2016)
 Sung Advice #1-8 (2017)

Video podcasts
 Risk!: NYC PodFest (2013)
 Robert Kelly's You Know What Dude: #162 (2017)
 Never Not Funny: Talking Eyebrows (2020)
 Quip League: with Moshe Kasher (2020)
 Linda Marcus Smith's The Comics' Spot: with Comedian Michael Adam Kaplan (2020)
 Ghole: Hanging with Myq A.K.A. Myq Kaplan (2020)
 The Comedy Studio: Podcast LIVE Sept. 22 (2020)
 Face to Facetime: #22 (2020)
 The Dave Hill Goodtime Hour: October 5 (2020)
 The Ted Alexandro Show: Ep. 27 (2020)
 Scot Nery: Is it a mistake to specialize? (2020)
 The Rhett Sever Podcast: #2 Existentialism (2021)

Notes

External links
Official website
Myq Kaplan's blog

Myq Kaplan at MySpace
Myq Kaplan at Facebook
Myq Kaplan at Twitter
Myq Kaplan podcast interview on The Gentlemen's Club with Caleb Bacon
Myq Kaplan album review

1978 births
American male television actors
American stand-up comedians
America's Got Talent contestants
Brandeis University alumni
Jewish American comedians
Last Comic Standing contestants
Living people
Male actors from New Jersey
People from Livingston, New Jersey
21st-century American comedians